David Waller (27 November 1920 – 23 January 1997) was an English actor best known for his role as Inspector Jowett in the British television series Cribb. He also appeared as Stanley Baldwin in ITV's Edward & Mrs Simpson (1978), and in "The Woman He Loved" (1988).

Waller worked extensively in the theatre and was a mainstay at the Royal Shakespeare Company from its founding until the early 1980s. He played Bottom in the original cast of Peter Brook's celebrated 1970 Royal Shakespeare Company production of A Midsummer Night's Dream. He also appeared in films including roles in Work Is a Four-Letter Word (1968), Perfect Friday (1970), Shadowlands (1985), Lady Jane (1986) and The Secret Garden (1987).
 
He died in 1997 and was survived by his wife.

Partial filmography
Work Is a Four-Letter Word (1968) - Mr. Price
Perfect Friday (1970) - Williams
Shadowlands (1985) - Warnie Lewis
Lady Jane (1986) - Archbishop Cranmer
The Secret Garden (1987) - Dr. Craven
Miss Marple: 4:50 from Paddington - Inspector Duckham

Notable theatre roles
Pandarus in Troilus and Cressida, Royal Shakespeare Company, 1968 and 1976
Claudius in Hamlet, RSC 1970
Bottom in Midsummer Night's Dream, RSC 1970
Caesar in Julius Caesar, RSC 1987

References

External links
 
 

1920 births
1997 deaths
English male television actors
English male stage actors
People educated at Bootham School
20th-century English male actors